The Zytek Z11SN is a LMP2-class car, which has been built by Zytek Engineering since 2011. It is an evolution of the Zytek 07S and the Zytek 09SC, updated for the new Le Mans Prototype regulations that were introduced in 2011. It has been predominantly used in the European Le Mans Series and the 24 Hours of Le Mans, and a Greaves Motorsport-entered Z11SN won the LMP2 categories of both series in 2011. In 2014, Jota Sport won the LMP2 category of the 24 Hours of Le Mans with a Z11SN.

In 2015, following Zytek's rebranding to Gibson Technology, the Z11SN was updated to the Gibson 015S.

History
For 2011, the Le Mans Prototype rules were changed to reduce costs. As a result, the Ginetta-Zytek GZ09S became obsolete, and the Zytek 09SC, previously an LMP2-class car, became an LMP1-class car. In response to this, Zytek developed the car into the new Z11SN, and signed a deal with NISMO to use the Nissan GT-R Super GT's Nissan VK45DE engine. Greaves Motorsport were the only team to enter a Z11SN in its first season, with their chassis having originally been a Zytek 07S. The car was immediately successful, with a debut class victory (and third overall) at the 6 Hours of Castellet, driven by Karim Ojjeh, Gary Chalandon and Tom Kimber-Smith. The season would prove to be a successful one; Greaves Motorsport took the class victory at the 24 Hours of Le Mans, and the LMP2 Team's Championship title in the Le Mans Series. At the end of the season, this chassis was retired, and three new ones were built.

For 2012, Jota Sport entered a Z11SN in the European Le Mans Series (ELMS), finishing eighth in class in the first round of the season, the 6 Hours of Castellet. Greaves Motorsport bought two chassis, and also entered them in the ELMS. Both teams also entered that year's 24 Hours of Le Mans, with Greaves' No. 42 car being the most notable entry – it was driven by former Formula 1 driver Martin Brundle, his son Alex, and Lucas Ordóñez. The No. 42 car finished eighth in class, whilst the other Greaves car finished fifth, and the Jota Sport entry failed to finish. Greaves Motorsport finished third in class the European Le Mans Series that year, whilst Jota Sport finished tenth.

In 2013, Greaves Motorsport and Jota Sport both remained in the European Le Mans Series with their Z11SN chassis. The season started successfully, with Jota Sport taking a victory at the 2013 6 Hours of Silverstone. Caterham Motorsport announced that they would be entering the 24 Hours of Le Mans for the first time, using a Z11SN, with Alexander Rossi, Tom Kimber-Smith and Eric Lux as their drivers. The entry was a joint venture between Caterham and Greaves Motorsport, with Greaves also entering a Z11SN under their own banner, driven by Jann Mardenborough, Lucas Ordóñez and Michael Krumm. Jota Sport also entered the event with a Z11SN, with their drivers Simon Dolan, Oliver Turvey and Lucas Luhr. The Greaves Motorsport entry was the most successful of the three, as Mardenborough, Ordonez and Krumm finished fourth in the LMP2 category.

In 2014 Jota Sport won the LMP2 class at the 24 Hours of Le Mans with their Z11SN chassis.

For 2015, the car was substantially developed as the Gibson 015S, following the purchase of Zytek by Continental AG that established Gibson Technology. Jota Sport used it to finish second in the LMP2 class and 10th overall in the 2015 24 Hours of Le Mans, 48 seconds behind the KCMG's Oreca.

In 2016, Strakka Racing finished 4th in the LMP2 class and 8th overall in the 2016 24 Hours of Le Mans using the Gibson 015S, the highest result for the prototype in the race.

References

Le Mans Prototypes
24 Hours of Le Mans race cars
Sports prototypes
Zytek Engineering vehicles